Thierry Jean-Pierre (1955–2005) was a French judge and Member of the European Parliament (MEP).

1955 births
2005 deaths
People from Mende, Lozère
Burials at Père Lachaise Cemetery
20th-century French judges
MEPs for France 1994–1999
MEPs for France 1999–2004
Movement for France MEPs
Liberal Democracy (France) MEPs
Deaths from cancer in France